Tragumna is a small hamlet and beach located in the civil parish of Castlehaven about 5 km from the town of Skibbereen in County Cork, Ireland.

The small beach at Tragumna overlooks a tiny island, Drishane Island, which is about 100 metres offshore. The beach was awarded a Blue Flag for the years 2019 and 2020.

A small lake (Lough ) is nearby and is visited by birdwatchers. 3 km away is Lough Hyne which is a designated Marine Nature Reserve.

References

Beaches of County Cork
Birdwatching sites